The 2006 Kazakhstan Premier League was the 15th season of the Kazakhstan Premier League, the highest football league competition in Kazakhstan, and took place between 31 March and 10 November.

Teams
For the 2006 season, Kaisar and Energetik were promoted to the Premier League, replacing Zhetysu and Bolat MSK who were relegated.

Before the start of the season Zhenis Astana became Astana.

Team overview

League table

Results

Season statistics

Top scorers

References

Kazakhstan Premier League seasons
1
Kazakh
Kazakh